The 61st season of the Campeonato Gaúcho kicked off on June 7, 1981 and ended in November 29, 1981. Twelve teams participated. Internacional won their 26th title. Armour and São Gabriel were relegated.

Participating teams

System 
The championship would have two stages.:

 First phase: The twelve clubs played each other in a double round-robin system. The eight best teams qualified to the Final phase, with the best teams and the best hinterland teams in each round earning one bonus point. the bottom two teams in the sum of both rounds were relegated.
 Final phase: The eight remaining teams played each other in a double round-robin system; the team with the most points won the title.

Championship

First phase

First round

Second round

Final standings

Relegation Playouts 

São Gabriel relegated

Final phase

References 

Campeonato Gaúcho seasons
Gaúcho